Constancy may refer to:
 Subjective constancy
 Color constancy
 Consistency (see also Consistency (disambiguation))
 Permanence
 Immutability, as an theological attribute

See also 
 Constant (disambiguation)
 Inconstancy (disambiguation)